Ali Krasniqi (born 1952) is a Kosovar writer and activist, who came to prominence at the start of the Kosovo conflict.

References
http://www.geocities.com/~Patrin/kosovo.htm (Archived 2009-10-25) 
http://perso.orange.fr/balval/Kosovo/Galjus.htm 

Kosovan Romani people
Romani writers
Romani activists
Ashkali
Living people
1952 births
Date of birth missing (living people)
Kosovan activists
Place of birth missing (living people)